Ruizia may refer to:
 Ruizia, a genus of plants in the family Malvaceae
 Ruizia, a synonym of Peumus, a genus of plants in the family Monimiaceae
 Ruizia, synonym of Rhigonema, a genus of nematodes in the family Rhigonematidae
 Ruizia, a publication of the Royal Botanical Garden of Madrid